The Unknown Kimi Raikkonen is an authorised biography on Finnish racing driver Kimi Räikkönen by Kari Hotakainen. Its English translation was published on 18 October 2018 to high expectations, being a projected bestseller by Ian Marshall of Simon & Schuster.

References

2018 non-fiction books
Finnish biographies
Sports biographies
Kimi Räikkönen
Simon & Schuster books